This is a list of the 12 observers to the European Parliament for Croatia in the 2009 to 2014 session. They were appointed by the Croatian Parliament to be observers from 1 April 2012 until the accession of Croatia to the EU on 1 July 2013.

List

References

Sources
 The Observers in the European Parliament

List
Croatia
2012
Croatia

de:Liste der Mitglieder des 7. Europäischen Parlamentes#Beobachter